John Galloway Miller (12 March 1895 – 1956) was a Scottish footballer who played as a forward.

He counted Hamilton Academical, Liverpool (8 English Football League appearances as well as a full season during wartime), Partick Thistle and Aberdeen among his clubs.

His elder brothers Tom (who also played for Hamilton Accies and Liverpool, as well as the Scottish national team), William and Adam were also footballers.

References

1895 births
Scottish footballers
Liverpool F.C. players
Footballers from Motherwell
Larkhall Thistle F.C. players
Blantyre Victoria F.C. players
Hamilton Academical F.C. players
Aberdeen F.C. players
Partick Thistle F.C. players
Clyde F.C. players
Dundee F.C. players
Dunfermline Athletic F.C. players
Prescot Cables F.C. players
Barrow A.F.C. players
Carlisle United F.C. players
Association football forwards
Scottish Junior Football Association players
Scottish Football League players
English Football League players
British Army personnel of World War I
Gordon Highlanders soldiers
1956 deaths